WAN or Wan may also refer to:

Language
 Wan language of the Ivory Coast
 万/萬 (Pinyin: Wàn), 10,000 in Chinese

People
 Wan (surname) ( and ), a Chinese surname
 Wan (surname 溫), an alternative spelling for the Chinese surname Wen (溫)
 Wan Wan (彎彎; born 1981) Taiwanese artist and actress

Places

Asia
 Anhui, abbreviated Wǎn (皖), province of China
 Wan, now Nanyang, Henan, a city in China
 Van, Turkey
 Wan, a village in Sialkot District, Punjab, Pakistan
 Wan Man, an island in Terengganu, Malaysia

Elsewhere
 Wan, Burkina Faso, a town in Burkina Faso
 Wanborough railway station, Surrey, England (GB station code: WAN)

Other uses
  Wataniya Airways, a defunct Kuwaiti airline (ICAO designator: WAN)
 Wide area network, telecommunications network that extends over a large geographic area
 World Association of Newspapers
Wan, a fictional character in the novel The Boy Who Would Live Forever

See also

 Wan Ok Phansa, an observance in Thailand
 
 
 
 Wans (disambiguation)